Jorge Orosmán da Silva Echeverrito (born 11 December 1961) is a Uruguayan former footballer who played as a striker.

Nicknamed "Polilla" ("Moth" in English), he played professionally in four countries his own notwithstanding. In 2007, he embarked in a managerial career.

Da Silva played nearly 30 times with Uruguay, representing the nation at the 1986 World Cup and the 1993 Copa América tournaments.

Playing career

Club
Born in Montevideo, da Silva made his debut in 1977 for C.A. Fénix. He then had a short spell with Danubio F.C. before joining Defensor Sporting in 1978.

Da Silva moved to Spain in late 1982, where he started playing for Real Valladolid and won the Pichichi Trophy (for the league's top scorer) in 1983–84 with 17 goals in 30 matches. He was only the second club player ever to win the award, and he also help add its first piece of silverware in the same season, the Copa de la Liga; he then represented Atlético Madrid after Hugo Sánchez left for Real Madrid, and netted 21 La Liga goals in two seasons, helping the team to the Copa del Rey and the Supercopa de España, both in 1985.

In 1987, da Silva returned to South America and signed for Club Atlético River Plate of Argentina. Two years later he went to Colombia to play for América de Cali, winning the Categoría Primera A twice during his four-year spell.

After another year in the country, with Millonarios FC, da Silva returned to his native land and re-joined Defensor Sporting, where he retired at nearly 36.

International
Having made his debut for Uruguay on 20 February 1982, in a 2–2 draw against South Korea for the Nehru Cup, da Silva went on to earn a further 25 caps. He was part of the squad at the 1986 FIFA World Cup, going scoreless in three matches (out of four) and being booked twice.

Coaching career
Da Silva began working as a manager after retiring, being in charge of Uruguay's youths as well as acting as assistant to the senior team under Víctor Púa. In 2007 he returned to his last club, leading it to the Primera División title in 2008 and reaching the quarter-finals of the following year's Copa Libertadores; after two years, he moved to the Saudi Professional League with Al Nassr FC.

On 15 December 2010, Argentine Primera División team Godoy Cruz Antonio Tomba announced the hiring of da Silva as Omar Asad's replacement. On 27 February 2012 he left fellow league side Club Atlético Banfield to return to his country and join Peñarol, where he went on to conquer two accolades including the 2013 national championship.

On 19 June 2013, da Silva was appointed head coach at Baniyas Club in the UAE Pro League. He returned to Peñarol in January 2016 following a second spell with Al-Nassr, leaving the former on 9 October due to poor results.

Da Silva was announced as new head coach of América de Cali on 4 September 2017. He returned to the United Arab Emirates on 12 October 2019, signing with Al-Ittihad Kalba SC for one season.

Honours

Player
Valladolid
Copa de la Liga: 1984

Atlético Madrid
Supercopa de España: 1985

América de Cali
Categoría Primera A: 1990, 1992

Manager
Defensor Sporting
Uruguayan Primera División: 2007–08; Apertura 2007, Clausura 2009

Peñarol
Uruguayan Primera División: 2012–13; Apertura 2012

Al-Nassr
Saudi Professional League: 2014–15

Individual
Pichichi Trophy: 1983–84

References

External links

National team data 

1961 births
Living people
Uruguayan people of Brazilian descent
Uruguayan people of Portuguese descent
Footballers from Montevideo
Uruguayan footballers
Association football forwards
Uruguayan Primera División players
Centro Atlético Fénix players
Danubio F.C. players
Defensor Sporting players
La Liga players
Real Valladolid players
Atlético Madrid footballers
Argentine Primera División players
Club Atlético River Plate footballers
Primera B de Chile players
Club Deportivo Palestino footballers
Categoría Primera A players
América de Cali footballers
Millonarios F.C. players
Uruguay under-20 international footballers
Uruguay international footballers
1986 FIFA World Cup players
1993 Copa América players
Uruguayan expatriate footballers
Expatriate footballers in Spain
Expatriate footballers in Argentina
Expatriate footballers in Chile
Expatriate footballers in Colombia
Uruguayan expatriate sportspeople in Spain
Uruguayan expatriate sportspeople in Argentina
Uruguayan expatriate sportspeople in Chile
Uruguayan expatriate sportspeople in Colombia
Pichichi Trophy winners
Uruguayan football managers
Uruguayan Primera División managers
Defensor Sporting managers
Peñarol managers
Al Nassr FC managers
Argentine Primera División managers
Club Atlético Banfield managers
Godoy Cruz Antonio Tomba managers
Baniyas SC managers
América de Cali managers
Al-Ittihad Kalba SC managers
UAE Pro League managers
Uruguayan expatriate football managers
Expatriate football managers in Saudi Arabia
Expatriate football managers in Argentina
Expatriate football managers in the United Arab Emirates
Expatriate football managers in Colombia
Uruguayan expatriate sportspeople in Saudi Arabia
Uruguayan expatriate sportspeople in the United Arab Emirates